The National Carbon Company was founded in 1886 by the former Brush Electric Company executive W. H. Lawrence, in association with Myron T. Herrick, James Parmelee, and Webb Hayes, son of U.S. President Rutherford B. Hayes, in Cleveland, Ohio. In 1890, National Carbon merged with Thomson-Houston, Standard Carbon, and Faraday Carbon.

History 
In 1894 the company began marketing Leclanché wet cells. At the same time, E. M. Jewett, was working in the company's Lakewood plant on the west side of Cleveland, under the direction of George Little. Jewett became interested in dry cells and, in his free time, conducted experiments in the laboratory. He developed a paper-lined, 1.5 volt cylindrical dry cell which he showed to Lawrence, who gave Jewett and Little a green light to begin manufacturing commercial dry cells. The trademark "Columbia" was proposed by Nelson C. Cotabish, a sales manager at NCC. In 1896 the company marketed the very first battery intended for widespread consumer use: the sealed, six-inch, 1.5 volt Columbia. NCC was the first company to successfully manufacture and distribute sealed dry cell batteries on a large scale.

The company introduced the first D cell battery in 1898.

The existing National Carbon Company grew significantly in 1899.  The firm "incorporated under New Jersey laws January 16, 1899 as a consolidation of the following companies engaged in the manufacture of lighting carbons, carbon brushes for generators and motors, carbon batteries, carbon diaphragms and back plates for telephones, carbons for electrolytic purposes and kindred products. 
 American Carbon Co Noblesville Ind 
 Brush Carbon Works Cleveland Ohio 
 Faraday Carbon Co Jeannette, Pennsylvania 
 Globe Carbon Co Ravana Ohio 
 National Carbon Co Cleveland Ohio 
 Partridge Carbon Co Sandusky Ohio 
 Phoenix Carbon & Mfg Co St. Louis Mo 
 Solar Carbon & Mfg Co Pittsburgh 
 The Standard Carbon Co Cleveland Ohio 
 Thomson Houston Carbon Co Fremont, Ohio 
 The Washington Carbon Co Pittsburgh 

 
The company supplied approximately 75% of the US carbon market in the world.

In 1906, National Carbon Company, which had been supplying Conrad Hubert's American Electrical Novelty & Manufacturing Company (maker of Ever Ready flashlights and batteries) with materials for batteries, bought half interest in the company for $200,000. The name was changed to The American Ever Ready Company and the trademark was shortened to one word - Eveready. In 1914, The American Ever Ready Company became part of National Carbon Company now forming a manufacturer making both batteries and lighting products.

In 1917, Union Carbide acquired National Carbon Company.

From 1917 until 1921 Eveready used the trademark "DAYLO" for their flashlights and on their batteries.

The American Chemical Society designated the development of the Columbia dry cell battery as a National Historic Chemical Landmark on September 27, 2005. The commemorative plaques at Energizer in Cleveland and at Energizer headquarters in St. Louis read:

In 1896 the National Carbon Company (corporate predecessor of Energizer) developed the six-inch, 1.5 volt Columbia battery, the first sealed dry cell successfully manufactured for the mass market. The Columbia, a carbon-zinc battery with an acidic electrolyte, was a significant improvement over previous batteries, meeting consumer demand for a maintenance-free, durable, no-spill, inexpensive electrochemical power source. Finding immediate use in the rapidly expanding telephone and automobile industries, the Columbia launched the modern battery industry by serving as the basis for all dry cells for the next sixty years.

In 1940, the company supplied highly purified carbon for the role as nuclear graphite in nuclear fission experiments carried out by Enrico Fermi and Leo Szilard.

Legacy

Over the years, the company has had many names: the Boulton Carbon Company, the National Carbon Company, the Carbon Products Division of Union Carbide, the UCAR Carbon Company, UCAR International, and is now known as GrafTech International. A division spun off in 2017, NeoGraf Solutions, LLC, retains the original National Carbon factory in Lakewood, Ohio.  Notable offspring from the company include KEMET Laboratories (capacitor technologies), Cytec Industries', Engineered Materials group (carbon fiber products), Energizer Holdings (batteries), and National Specialty Products (carbon and graphite specialty products).

References

Battery manufacturers
Manufacturing companies based in Ohio
Companies based in Cleveland
Energy companies established in 1886
Manufacturing companies established in 1886
1886 establishments in Ohio
Recipients of the Scientific and Technical Academy Award of Merit
Academy Award for Technical Achievement winners